Fadee Andrawos (born 21 October 1981) is a Palestinian-Lebanese singer and actor of Palestinian origin. He debuted on television when he appeared on the Arab edition of Star Academy 3 representing Palestine in December 2005 and remained until the semi-finals.

He later went on to star in his own sitcom Fadi w Radi (Fadi and Radi), which aired on Lebanese Broadcasting Company.

Biography

Fadee Andrawos was born and raised in Beirut, Lebanon, to a Christian family. His father is Palestinian and his mother is Lebanese.

Music career

Singles
 2007: B2alby Dally / بقلبي ضلي
 2007: Bnam w Ba7lam Fik / بنام و بحلم فيك
 2008: Hayda Mesh Ana / هيدا مش أنا
 2009: Falistine w Lebnan / فلسطين و لبنان
 2010: Tla3y Menny / طلعي مني 
 2011: Shaddetny / شدتني
 2011: Chiffon series song (Chou Sare) / (أغنية مسلسل شيفون (شو صار
 2013: Maba3ref Koun / مابعرف كون
 2013: Ma3ak / معاك
 2014: Lamma Tkoun / لما تكون
 2014: Hikayit Nase / حكاية نصر
 2016: Ahwak Ahwak / أهواك اهواك
2019 ; Am Nelte2i / عم نلتقي

Sitcoms

 2006: Fadi w Radi / فادي و راضي
 2008: Jeeran / جيران

Series
2006:  Fadi W Radi / فادي وراضي
2008: Jiran / جيران
 2011: Chiffon / شيفون
 2012: Sabaya (season IV) / (صبايا (الموسم الرابع1
 2015: Solo elayl elhazin / صولو الليل الحزين
 2018: Habibi al ladoud / حبيبي اللدود
 2019: Hadoudet hob 2 (El3echk Elaswad) حدوتة حب 2 :العشق الأسود
2019: Ekhtirak / اختراق

References

External links
 Official website

Male actors from Beirut
1981 births
Palestinian male singers
21st-century Lebanese male singers
Lebanese people of Palestinian descent
Living people
Contestants from Arabic singing competitions
Palestinian Christians
Musicians from Beirut